The Bowaters Paper Railway was a  narrow gauge industrial railway running from Sittingbourne to Ridham Dock on The Swale in the county of Kent. It had the distinction of being the last steam-operated industrial narrow gauge railway in Britain when it closed in 1969. Part of the system still operates as the Sittingbourne & Kemsley Light Railway.

History

The manufacture of paper at Sittingbourne dates back to the seventeenth century. The paper mill was originally supplied with raw materials by barges that sailed to wharves at the head of Milton Creek. A short horse-hauled tramway moved pulp to the mill. Two steam locomotives were introduced in 1908.

In 1913, as Milton Creek began to silt up, the paper making company began work on the construction of Ridham Dock, a deepwater facility on the Swale estuary, where seagoing ships could unload raw materials and load finished paper products. At the start of the First World War the railway and the dock was taken over by the Admiralty and the railway was extended to connect the dock. After the end of the war the railway was returned to the paper company. In 1924 a second paper mill opened at Kemsley Down, and further extended in 1936. There was also a Standard gauge system around Kemsley and Ridham Dock that was connected to the Sheerness line near Swale.

Closure, preservation and uncertain future
In 1969, a time and motion study by the then owners, The Bowater Paper Corporation (Bowater), resulted in the closure of the railway. By this time the railway was the last industrial narrow gauge railway in Britain operating steam locomotives and, until withdrawn from 30 September 1969, had operated a scheduled passenger service for its employees between the Sittingbourne mill and Ridham Dock. Bowaters had a "handing over" ceremony to the news lessees, the Locomotive Club of Great Britain (LCGB), on 4 October 1969 but continued running its goods trains until the final one on 25 October 1969. The LCGB was granted a lease of the southern portion of the railway between Sittingbourne and Kemsley Down in 1970. Much of the rest of the equipment went to form the Great Whipsnade Railway. The LCGB formed the Sittingbourne and Kemsley Light Railway Company to operate the railway. The company operates the railway under the name Sittingbourne & Kemsley Light Railway (S&KLR).

Locomotives

See also
 British narrow gauge railways
 Sittingbourne and Kemsley Light Railway

References

External links
 Sittingbourne's Steam Railway, Sittingbourne and Kemsley Light Railway Limited official website

2 ft 6 in gauge railways in England
Industrial railways in England
Rail transport in Kent
Transport in Swale
Railway lines opened in 1906
Railway lines closed in 1969
Sittingbourne
1906 establishments in England